Kollam Metropolitan Area is the 4th largest Metropolis in Kerala and 14th largest urban agglomeration in South India. It is one of the 10 fastest growing cities in the world covering an area of 364.51 km2 (2015) with a 31.1% urban growth between 2015 and 2020 as per the survey conducted by Economist Intelligence Unit (EIU) based on urban area growth during January 2020.

The metropolitan area, constituted on the basis of  2011 census data, consists of Kollam Municipal Corporation (Quilon), 2 municipalities, 22 Panchayaths and parts of 2 Panchayaths. The two municipalities are Paravur and Karunagappalli. The 21 Panchayaths are Adichanalloor, Adinad, Ayanivelikulangara, Chavara, Elampalloor, Kallelibhagom, Kottamkara, Kulasekharapuram, Mayyanad, Meenad, Nedumpana, Oachira, Panayam, Panmana, Perinad, Poothakkulam, Thazhuthala, Thodiyoor, Thazhava, Thrikkaruva, Thrikkovilvattom, and Vadakkumthala. Outgrowth of Neendakara, Eravipuram and Thrikkadavoor panchayaths are also included in the Kollam metropolitan area.

Constituents of the urban agglomeration

See also 

 List of million-plus urban agglomerations in India
 List of most populous urban agglomerations in Kerala
 List of cities and towns in Kerala

References 

Government of Kollam
Metropolitan areas of India
Populated coastal places in India